Opie is a surname, a given name and a nickname. Notable people with the name include:

Given name or nickname
Opie Cates (1909–1987), American clarinet player
Gregg Hughes, American radio personality, known by his air name Opie, former co-host of Opie and Anthony
Opie Ortiz, American artist specializing in tattoos, pop art and murals
Otto P. Weyland (1903–1979), United States Air Force general

Surname
Alan Opie (born 1945), British baritone singer
Amelia Opie (1769–1853), English author; the wife of John Opie
Catherine Opie (born 1961), American artist and photographer
Eugene Lindsay Opie (1873–1971), American pathologist
Iona Opie (1923–2017), British specialist in children's literature and the customs of schoolchildren; the wife of Peter Opie
John Opie (1761–1807), Cornish historical and portrait painter; the husband of Amelia Opie
Julian Opie, British artist known for his use of vector-based reproductions
June Opie (1924–1999), New Zealand polio survivor and writer
Lisa Opie (born 1963), English squash player
Peter Opie (1918–1982), British specialist in children's literature and the customs of schoolchildren; the husband of Iona Opie
Redvers Opie (1900–1984), British economist
 Robert Opie, British item collector and the director of the Museum of Brands, Packaging and Advertising; son of Iona and Peter Opie

Fictional characters
Opie (Family Guy), on the animated TV series Family Guy
Opie, a squirrel on the animated TV series Capitol Critters
Opie, the titular character of the American film Opie Gets Laid
Opie, Happy Lowman's beloved dog (named after the Sons of Anarchy SAMCRO member Opie Winston) that plays a pivotal role in Mayans M.C. season 2
Opie Taylor, on the TV series The Andy Griffith Show
Opie Winston, a SAMCRO member on the TV series Sons of Anarchy